The San Diego County District Attorney is the elected district attorney for San Diego County, California.  This office is responsible for the prosecution of  both felony and misdemeanor violations of California state law that occur within the jurisdiction of San Diego County, California. Courts within their jurisdiction includes the San Diego Superior Court, the California Court of Appeal for the Fourth District, and the California Supreme Court. Federal law violations are prosecuted by the U.S. Attorney for the Southern District of California. The current District Attorney is Summer Stephan, who replaced Bonnie Dumanis on an interim basis after the latter resigned in July 2017.

As in most of California, some misdemeanor crimes are prosecuted by local city attorneys.  City attorneys share jurisdiction with the District Attorney to prosecute misdemeanors and infractions that are committed within the city's jurisdiction.  All other misdemeanor, felony, and infraction violations that occur within San Diego County are prosecuted by the district attorney.

The main office is located in Downtown San Diego in the Hall of Justice, with three regional centers in El Cajon, Chula Vista, and Vista. As of 2011 the District Attorney's office employs 310 attorneys.

The District Attorney's office claims a 90+ percent conviction rate.  The conviction rate for driving under the influence (DUI) in 2010 was 98% of 11,000 people charged with felony or misdemeanor DUI.

History
In the first 20 years of San Diego County there were 23 men that held the office of district attorney, the first being William C. Ferrell.

Partial list of District Attorneys

Bureau of Investigation 

The San Diego District Attorney currently maintains a law enforcement arm called Bureau of Investigation. It consists of eight divisions, which include 130 District Attorney Investigators who are sworn California peace officers pursuant to § 830.1(a) California Penal Code and other non sworn staff.

Amongst its law enforcement duties and responsibilities are assignments which may include pre-trial, gang, economic, insurance, fraud investigations; family protection, child abduction, sex crimes, stalking, and special operation investigations. Apart from this, San Diego DA Investigators may be assigned to regional local, state and federal task forces such as: computer and high tech crimes, narcotics, auto theft, identity theft, violent crimes, SAFE and fraud.

References

External links

 
District Atty